Gala Montes is a Mexican actress and singer best known for her works in telenovelas. She became known on television for her character as Luz Marina in the seasons three and four of the drug trafficking television series El Señor de los Cielos (2015–2016). In 2018, she landed her first lead role in a telenovela on Mi familia perfecta (2018). In 2020 she joined Televisa to be part of the main cast La mexicana y el güero, and subsequently she got her second lead role in the telenovela Diseñando tu amor (2021).

Filmography

References

External links 
 

Mexican telenovela actresses
Living people
Year of birth missing (living people)